Ambra Health (formerly DICOM Grid), is a software company that provides solutions for medical image sharing of DICOM and non-DICOM data between patients, physicians, and hospitals.

History
The company was founded as DICOM Grid, Inc. in 2004 to make digital medical imaging on a cloud based platform. DICOM Grid launched their cloud based platform as DG Suite, that allows to store diagnostic imaging and health data in its platform that can be accessed and shared by the healthcare providers and patients. The platform was later approved under the Health Insurance Portability and Accountability Act (HIPAA). It received best in KLAS awards continuously from 2014 to 2017 and also received 2016 SIIA CODiE award.

In September 2016, the company re-branded itself to Ambra Health a DBA of DICOM Grid, Inc. As of 2017, the company claims to have 750 healthcare providers using its platform.

Products and Services
 DICOM and non-DICOM image viewer
 Medical Image Sharing
 Image routing
 Vendor Neutral Archive
 Cloud computing based Picture & Archiving Communications System

Funding

 March 2010- $11.88 million 
 Nov, 2010- $7.5 million
 May, 2012- $5 million
 July, 2014- $6 million 
 Nov, 2015- $3 million
 March, 2016- $6 million
 September, 2016- $6 million

Partnerships

 AthenaHealth
 drchrono
 Modernizing Medicine
 Radiological Society of North America
 RSNA Image Share
 CommonWell Health Alliance

References

Medical imaging
DICOM software